The Hate of a Hun is a 1916 novel by Arthur Wright about Germans in Australia during World War I.

References

External links
The Hate of a Hun at AustLit
Complete novel at Internet Archive
The Hate of a Hun at National Archives of Australia
Complete copy of story serialised in World's News 1916 - 22 July, 29 July, 5 August, 12 August, 19 August, 26 August, 2 Sept, 9 Sept, 16 Sept, 23 Sept, 30 Sept, 7 Oct - final 

1916 Australian novels
Australian adventure novels
Novels set during World War I
Novels set in Australia